Jan of Melsztyn ( or ) was a Polish nobleman (szlachcic).

Jan was owner of Melsztyn and Książ estates. He served as Łowczy of Kraków since 1339, castellan of Wojnice since 1345, voivode of the Sandomierz Voivodeship since 1361 and castellan of Kraków since 1360 or 1366.

His granddaughter Elizabeth Granowska became Queen consort of Poland.

14th-century births
1381 deaths
14th-century Polish nobility
Jan of Melsztyna